The 2017 Boodles Challenge was an exhibition tournament held before Wimbledon to serve as a warm-up to players. Taking place from 27 June to 1 July 2017 at Stoke Park in London, it was the 16th edition of the Boodles Challenge. As with last year, no player was declared champion.

Participants
On 21 June, the tournament organizers announced a preliminary list with 12 confirmed players for this edition:
  Roberto Bautista Agut
  Pablo Carreño Busta
  Juan Martín del Potro
  Ernests Gulbis
  Philipp Kohlschreiber
  Thanasi Kokkinakis
  Nick Kyrgios
  Benoît Paire
  Albert Ramos Viñolas
  Gilles Simon
  Alexander Zverev
  David Goffin (withdrew due to a right ankle injury suffered during the French Open)

Results

Day 1 (27 June)

The last two matches of the day were cancelled due to rain.

Day 2 (28 June)

The Shapovalov vs Berankis match was cancelled due to rain, with the score tied 4–4 in the 1st set.

Day 3 (29 June)

Day 4 (30 June)

Day 5 (1 July)

References

Boodles Challenge
Boodles Challenge
Boodles Challenge
Boodles Challenge
Boodles Challenge
Boodles Challenge